Mohammed Hamid may refer to:

 Mohammed Hamid (entrepreneur), Ugandan national of Arab descent, born in Sudan
 Mohammed Hamid (terrorist), British national of Indian descent, born in Tanzania